Kermit is a city in and the county seat of Winkler County, Texas, United States. The population was 5,708 at the 2010 census. The city was named after Kermit Roosevelt following a visit by his father, President Theodore Roosevelt, to the county.

History

Establishment

Kermit began as a convenient supply center for the scattered ranches of the area and became the seat of Winkler County when the county was organized in 1910. The first public school and the post office opened the same year. The town's namesake, Kermit Roosevelt, once visited the T Bar Ranch in northern Winkler County to hunt antelope a few months before the town was named. In 1916, the county suffered a drought. Many homesteaders and ranchers were forced to leave. In 1924, only Ern Baird's family remained in the town. Only one student attended school in the county for five months of 1924. Only three houses and the courthouse were in use by 1926.

Discovery of oil

On July 16, 1926, however, oil was discovered in Hendrick oilfield, near Kermit, and the town experienced a boom. In 1927, a population of 1,000 was reported; by 1929 that number increased to 1,500. On March 4, 1929, the Texas-New Mexico Railway reached the town.

Great Depression and incorporation

The Great Depression had little effect on the city throughout much of the 1930s, but the population decreased significantly in the early 1930s, and both population and business figures rose at the end of the 1930s, when 2,700 residents and 180 businesses were listed. On February 15, 1938, residents voted to incorporate. During the 1940s, the oil boom caused real estate prices to double. Housing was scarce, and some people lived in tents. A bank was opened by 1945. The grade school had to be enlarged, and a hospital was built.

Oil boom days

In the 1950s, the town continued to grow; housing additions were built. By 1960, the city had a population of 10,465 and 260 businesses, and additional growth estimated to be over 12,000 during the decade. Flooding became a problem because of the flat terrain, so new crown streets were constructed to solve the flooding problem, and more housing additions were built. The town moved the last working wooden derrick in the Permian Basin from Loving County to Pioneer Park in Kermit in 1966 as a symbol of the importance of the oil industry to the economy of Kermit and Winkler County. In the 1970s and 1980s, the population of Kermit bounced between 8,500 and 6,912, and the number of businesses moved between 200 and 116. Improvements were made in city services, and more housing additions were built.

On June 3, 1980, a 9-ft-wide (3 m) sinkhole opened on the property of Atlantic Richfield Company and got progressively larger. The 1990 United States census set the population of Kermit at 6,875.

Geography
Kermit is located at  (31.853995, 103.092336). The city is located in a semiarid region of the Permian Basin.

Climate
This area has a large amount of sunshine year round due to its stable descending air and high pressure.  According to the Köppen climate classification system, Kermit has a mild desert climate, Bwh on climate maps.

Demographics

2020 census

As of the 2020 United States census, there were 6,267 people, 2,096 households, and 1,493 families residing in the city.

2010 census
At the 2010 census, 5,690 people resided in the city.  At the 2000 census, 5,714 people, 2,097 households and 1,585 families resided in the city. The population density was 2,288.3 per square mile (882.5/km). The 2,592 housing units averaged of 1,038.0 per square mile (400.3/km). The racial makeup of the city was 72.65% White, 2.05% African American, 0.47% Native American, 0.25% Asian, 22.52% from other races, and 2.07% from two or more races. Hispanics or Latinos of any race were 47.83% of the population.

Of the 2,097 households,  38.7% had children under the age of 18 living with them, 61.3% were married couples living together, 10.0% had a female householder with no husband present, and 24.4% were not families. About 22.3% of all households were made up of individuals, and 12.0% had someone living alone who was 65 years of age or older. The average household size was 2.71 and the average family size was 3.18.

Age distribution was 29.9% under the age of 18, 8.9% from 18 to 24, 25.3% from 25 to 44, 20.7% from 45 to 64, and 15.2% who were 65 years of age or older. The median age was 35 years. For every 100 females, there were 95.0 males. For every 100 females age 18 and over, there were 91.2 males.

The median household income was $38,825, as opposed to $29,143 in 2000, and the median family income was $31,690. Males had a median income of $29,596 versus $18,380 for females. About 15.7% of families and 20.4% of the population were below the poverty line, including 27.8% of those under age 18 and 16.7% of those age 65 or over.

Education

Libraries
Winkler County Library

Schools
The City of Kermit is served by the Kermit Independent School District,  established in 1928, in a consolidation of two area school districts. The district now has three campuses: Kermit Elementary (grades K–4), Kermit Junior High (grades 5–8), and Kermit High School (grades 9–12).

All of Winkler County is zoned to Odessa College.

Newspapers
Odessa American (shipped from Odessa, Texas)

Hazardous waste site
In July, 2017, the U.S. Environmental Protection Agency gave  Kermit a federal Superfund designation, marking it as one of the most hazardous waste sites in the country. The EPA said in a statement that a portion of the Santa Rosa Aquifer in Kermit has been added to the Superfund program's National Priorities List. The aquifer in the city west of Odessa has a contaminated groundwater plume a mile long and 1.5 miles wide.

Notable people

 Claude Batchelor, U.S. Army soldier convicted of collaborating with China
 William Frankfather, actor
 Jim "Razor" Sharp, two-time PRCA world-champion bull rider
 Jay Thomas, Emmy-winning actor, born in Kermit (father was a West Texas oil man) and raised in New Orleans
 Del Thompson, American football player
 John Weaver (political consultant), founder of The Lincoln Project and alleged sexual harasser

References

External links

 City of Kermit website
 Kermit in the Handbook of Texas

Cities in Texas
Cities in Winkler County, Texas
County seats in Texas